Events in the year 1916 in Portugal.

Incumbents
 President: Bernardino Machado
 Prime Minister: António José de Almeida

Events
 Portugal enters the First World War.

Arts and entertainment
 Grão Vasco Museum founded

Sports
 Caldas Sport Clube founded

Births
 8 June – Emílio Lino, fencer (died 1958).

Deaths

 16 April – Mário de Sá-Carneiro, writer (born 1890)
 11 November – Francisco da Veiga Beirão, politician (born 1841)

References

 
1910s in Portugal
Portugal
Years of the 20th century in Portugal
Portugal